Opuntia picardoi is a species of cactus.

References

 The Plant List entry
 Encyclopedia of Life entry

picardoi